Robin Pogrebin (pron. ro-bin POG-re-bin, born May 17, 1965) has been a reporter for The New York Times since 1995, where she covers cultural institutions, the art world, architecture, and other subjects.

Biography
Pogrebin was born to a Jewish family, the daughter of writer Letty Cottin Pogrebin and Bert Pogrebin, a management-side labor lawyer. She is the identical twin sister of Abigail Pogrebin, also a writer. She is a graduate of Yale University.
 
At the Times, Pogrebin previously covered the media for the business desk and city news for the metro desk. She was also previously an associate producer for Peter Jennings' documentary unit at ABC News, where she covered stories on subjects such as Bosnia and Haiti. Before that, she spent three years as a staff reporter for the New York Observer, covering a range of subjects including city government, law and the restaurant business. Pogrebin's articles also run regularly in the International Herald Tribune and she has occasionally written freelance pieces for publications such as Architectural Digest, New York, Vogue, and Departures.

Pogrebin is also the author, with Kate Kelly, of The Education of Brett Kavanaugh: An Investigation, a book about allegations from Kavanaugh's 2018 Supreme Court nomination hearings with a publishing date in September 2019 from Portfolio Books, a division of Penguin Random House. Before publication, the Times published a widely criticized essay adapted from the book that primarily addressed accusations about an incident with Deborah Ramirez and another incident alleged by Max Stier, both of which occurred at Yale. Before Kavanaugh's confirmation in October, 2018, Pogrebin, who was a classmate of Kavanaugh at Yale, and Kelly, also at the Times, were featured in a podcast about what the then-judge's classmates were saying concerning his nomination to the Supreme Court.

See also
 New Yorkers in journalism

Personal life
In 1993, she married attorney Edward J. Klaris in a Jewish ceremony in New Paltz, New York. They separated in 2022.

References

The New York Times writers
1965 births
Living people
Yale University alumni
Jewish American journalists
20th-century American journalists
American twins
21st-century American journalists
American women journalists
20th-century American women
21st-century American women
21st-century American Jews